Sant'Eufemia is a Roman Catholic church located on Via Barbiani in Ravenna, region of Emilia Romagna, Italy.

The church was designed by Giovan Francesco Buonamici, and erected between 1742 and 1747 upon the foundations of a palaeo-Christian temple.  The central design recalls some of the ancient churches in town. The building, now deconsecrated, with three altars now represents the entrance of the archaeological site Domus dei Tappeti di Pietra, which houses the mosaic floors of a Byzantine-era palace.

References

18th-century Roman Catholic church buildings in Italy
Roman Catholic churches completed in 1747
Roman Catholic churches in Ravenna
Baroque architecture in Ravenna